Alfred Lüthi (born 31 July 1961) is a Swiss former professional ice hockey player. He competed with the Switzerland men's national ice hockey team at both the 1988 and 1992 Winter Olympic Games, as well as the 1987, 1991 and 1992 Men's World Ice Hockey Championships.

External links

1961 births
Living people
HC Lugano players
EHC Biel players
HC Fribourg-Gottéron players
Swiss ice hockey centres
Olympic ice hockey players of Switzerland
Ice hockey players at the 1988 Winter Olympics
Ice hockey players at the 1992 Winter Olympics